The Battle of Ceja del Negro was a battle of the Cuban War of Independence that took place on October 4, 1896. During the battle, the forces of all three different land armies participated: infantry, cavalry and artillery. The Cuban troops were commanded by Major Generals Antonio Maceo and Juan Rius Rivera, while the Spanish troops were led by Colonel Granados.

The Battle
The Cuban troops were lagging behind as a result of a large number of civilians that they carried with them. The fighting began around eight in the morning and lasts until around five in the afternoon when Maceo's troops are dedicated to harassing the last Spanish strongholds with the most notable stronghold being one known as El Guao, in one of the foothills of the hill known as Ceja del Negro.

The Spanish forces, far superior in number and military power, did not manage to win the battle, but Colonel Granados bombarded the river pass with artillery, where the Cubans were passing, causing large numbers of casualties, especially among the civilian population with the elderly being the most affected.

Aftermath
The victory of General Maceo in Ceja del Negro caused the Captain General of the island, Valeriano Weyler, to hasten his plans for reconcentration against the Cuban civilian population, in order to defeat the pro-independence troops, depriving them of the vital support of the peasants.

References

Conflicts in 1896
Battles involving Spain
Spanish colonial period of Cuba
October 1896 events
Battles involving Cuba